Ezequiel Castaño (born December 4, 1981) is an Argentine actor.

Biography 
Ezequiel Castaño was born on December 4, 1981 in Buenos Aires, Argentina. Ezequiel Castaño is the brother of the actress, Noelia Castaño. Ezequiel Castaño studied a Bachelor of Combined Arts at the University of Buenos Aires. He studied acting with Norman Briski.

Personal life 
Since 2010, Ezequiel Castaño is in a relationship with the photographer, Ailen Cibello.

Career 
Ezequiel Castaño began his career in television in 1995. From 1995 to 1998, he was part of the cast of the youth television series Chiquititas. Between 1996 and 1998, he made the theatrical seasons of Chiquititas. From 1999 to 2000, he was part of the cast of the youth television series Verano del '98. In August 2001, he makes a small participation in the youth television series Chiquititas. In 2001, he was summoned by Cris Morena for the special Chiquititas de Oro where she and the most prominent of all seasons came together to receive the award Chiquititas de Oro. In 2002, he was part of the cast of the television series Franco Buenaventura, el profe. In 2004, he makes a small participation in the youth television series Floricienta. In 2004, he makes a small participation in the television series Los Roldan. In 2005, he makes a small participation in the television series Amor mío. In 2007, he makes a small participation in the youth television series Casi Ángeles. In 2008, he was part of the cast of the television series Aquí no hay quien viva. From 2009 to 2010, he was part of the cast of the television series Ciega a citas. From 2009 to 2010, he was part of the cast of the television series Botineras. In 2011, he was part of the cast of the television series Maltratadas. In 2012, he was part of the cast of the television series Invasión Salamone. In 2013, he made his film debut, with the movie Mala. In 2018, he makes a small participation in the television series Golpe al corazón. In 2020, he makes a small participation in the television series Separadas.

Filmography

Television

Theater

Television programs

Movies

Discography

Soundtrack albums 

 1995 — Chiquititas Vol. 1
 1996 — Chiquititas Vol. 2
 1997 — Chiquititas Vol. 3
 1998  — Chiquititas Vol. 4

External links
serials.ru

1981 births
Living people
Argentine male actors